Nicomen Mountain, is the southernmost major summit of the Douglas Ranges in the Lower Mainland region of southern British Columbia. It is located to the north of Nicomen Island and the communities of Deroche and Lake Errock.

References

See also
Dewdney Peak

Mountains of the Lower Mainland
Douglas Ranges
One-thousanders of British Columbia
New Westminster Land District